The Van Speijk-class frigates were built for the Royal Netherlands Navy in the 1960s. They were versions of the British s with Dutch radars. The British design was chosen in order to enable rapid construction in order to replace elderly destroyer escorts and take up part of the NATO patrol duties of the decommissioned anti-submarine warfare carrier . The ships were modernised in the late 1970s. All six ships were sold to the Indonesian Navy in 1986–1989 and five are still in service as the s.

Dutch modifications

For the most part the Dutch limited their changes to the Leander design to a wholesale replacement of the original British electronics and electrical equipment by those from Dutch manufacturers. Hollandse Signaalapparaten supplied the entire electronics suite. Specifically their LW-02 long-range air-surveillance radar, the DA-02 medium-range air/surface search radar and the M45 combined radar and optical fire control system for the  guns. The Dutch HSA M44 radar/visual director for the Seacat anti-aircraft missiles could automatically target in elevation and bearing and allowed the single Seacat launcher on the British ships to be increased to two launchers on the Dutch ships, each with their own director.

Mid-life modernization
Beginning in December 1976 each of the Dutch ships was given a mid-life modernization that took about two years to finish. The twin 4.5-inch turret was replaced by a single OTO Melara 76 mm gun and two quadruple mounts for Harpoon anti-ship missiles were fitted abaft of the funnel. The Mk 10 Limbo ASW mortar was replaced by a pair of triple Mk 32 torpedo launchers, one mount on each side of the hangar, and its mount plated over so the flight deck could be increased to allow the ship to carry the larger Westland Lynx helicopter in lieu of the Wasp carried earlier. The removal of the variable-depth sonar from the quarterdeck to the interior of the stern also allowed more room for the flight deck.

The electronics were also upgraded, the LW-02 radar was exchanged for a LW-03 and the DA-02 was replaced by a DA-05 radar. Most importantly an automated combat management system, SEWACO V, was fitted to aid the ship's captain in decision making. Its power plant was also extensively automated. All told these changes allowed the crew to decrease in size from 254 to about 175 which allowed greatly increased standards of habitability.

Ships
All ships were named after Dutch naval officers. When sold to Indonesia, they were named after Indonesian National Armed Forces heroes.

Indonesian service

At least some, if not all, of the Indonesian ships have replaced their Seacat launchers with two twin Simbad launchers. Recently, the two quadruple Harpoon launchers were also replaced by Yakhont missile (SS-N-26) launchers purchased from Russia, because the early version Harpoon missiles previously installed were nearing their obsolescence period. There are also some conflicting reports that the Harpoon missiles were replaced with Chinese-sourced C-802 rather than Russian Yakhont. There are some pictures circulating on the internet showing several vessels of the class carrying box launchers that look much too small to be Yakhont's launchers, but they are the right size for C-802.

Pictures released in March 2011 show that modifications were made to KRI Oswald Siahaan with 4 SS-26 Yakhont VLS cells located in the quarterdeck beside the helicopter hangar.

Engine replacement
In Indonesian service, the Van Speijk class is known as the Ahmad Yani class after the lead ship. All were named after Indonesian Armed Forces heroes. Between 2003 and 2008, all vessels of the Ahmad Yani class had their existing steam turbine engines replaced with diesel propulsion.

Notes

References

 
 Conway's All the World's Fighting Ships 1947–1995 
 

Frigates of the Royal Netherlands Navy
Frigate classes